Adams is an unincorporated community located within North Brunswick Township in Middlesex County, New Jersey, United States. The community is located along Cozzens Lane (County Route 608) between Route 27 and U.S. Route 1. Except for commercial businesses lining Routes 1 and 27, the community is made up of mostly residential homes and apartment complexes. The community once had a station known as Adams Station, along the Pennsylvania Railroad (currently the Northeast Corridor Line), located on Adams Lane, just east of Route 1.

References

North Brunswick, New Jersey
Unincorporated communities in Middlesex County, New Jersey
Unincorporated communities in New Jersey